William Frederick Grant (born October 20, 1924 – October 6, 2011) was a Canadian plant geneticist, biosystematist, educator, and environmental advocate who developed higher plant species for monitoring and testing for mutagenic effects of environmental pollutants. He has carried out research on the genetics of species of the genus Lotus (Leguminosae) and the forage species Lotus corniculatus (birdsfoot trefoil) developing an innovative procedure for increasing seed production in the legume birdsfoot trefoil.

Biography
Born in Hamilton, Ontario, he received a Bachelor of Arts degree in 1947 from McMaster University and a master's degree in 1949. In 1953, he received a PhD degree from the University of Virginia.

In 1953, he was appointed botanist to the Department of Agriculture, Kuala Lumpur, Malaysia, through the Colombo Technical Cooperation Program under the operation of the Canadian Department of External Affairs, Ottawa. Since 1995 he has been a co-director of the International Program on Plant Bioassays in the use of higher plants in the testing for environmental mutagens in the global environment.

References

External links
Canadian Who’s Who
Colombo Plan for Technical Co-operation
International Organization of Plant Biosystematists
Lotus Newsletter
Lotus corniculatus

1924 births
2011 deaths
20th-century Canadian botanists
McMaster University alumni
University of Virginia alumni
Canadian expatriates in the United States
Canadian expatriates in Malaysia